Buford is a surname. Notable people with the surname include:

 Abraham Buford (1747–1833), commanding officer during the "Waxhaw Massacre"
 Abraham Buford II (1820–1884), Confederate general during the American Civil War
 Algernon Sidney Buford (1826–1911), American colonel and president of the Richmond and Danville Railroad
 Bill Buford (born 1954), American journalist
 Carter M. Buford (1876–1959), American politician from the state of Missouri
 Don Buford (born 1937), American major league baseball player
 George "Mojo" Buford (1929–2011), American blues harmonica player
 Jade Buford (born 1988), American racing driver
 Joe Buford (born 1967), American stock car driver
 John Buford (1826–1863), U.S. general during the American Civil War
 Mark Buford (born 1970), American basketball player
 Napoleon Bonaparte Buford (1807–1883), U.S. general during the American Civil War
 R. C. Buford (born 1960), general manager of an NBA basketball franchise

Further reading

See also
Bufford
Burford (surname)
Bluford (disambiguation)
Bruford (disambiguation)